Stan Costello is a retired Australian rules football player who played for West Adelaide in the South Australian National Football League (SANFL) from 1954 to 1964.

Costello, a defender, had his best year in 1956 when he was selected in the All-Australian team at the 1956 Perth Carnival and jointly won West Adelaide's Best and Fairest award with Aldo Rossetto.

References
 

Australian rules footballers from South Australia
West Adelaide Football Club players
All-Australians (1953–1988)
Living people
Year of birth missing (living people)